Helen Hills (born 1960) is a British art historian and academic. She was appointed Anniversary Reader of Art History at the University of York in 2005 and promoted to Professor of History of Art in 2008. Hence she was the first woman professor of Art History at that University Before this Helen Hills taught at the Universities of Keele and Manchester in the UK, at Queen's University in Canada and at the University of North Carolina at Chapel Hill. She has published numerous books and articles on art and architectural history. She has particular research interests in the Baroque art movement, and was a guest contributor to the BBC radio programme In Our Time about The Baroque Movement in November 2008 and "Night Waves" on 'The Baroque'.

Education and employment 
Helen Hills studied for a BA Hons in Modern History at the University of Oxford. She gained both an MA (Distinction) and PhD in History of Art from the Courtauld Institute of Art, University of London; during the latter she taught at Queen’s University, Canada. She was appointed Assistant Professor of Art History at University of North Carolina at Chapel Hill, US (1993–97) and Senior Lecturer in History of Art at University of Manchester (1998–2005), she joined the University of York in 2005 as Anniversary Reader in the History of Art. She was promoted to Professor of History of Art at the University of York in 2008. Hence she was the first woman professor of History of Art at the University of York.

Awards and recognitions 
British Academy Conference Award 2020 for "The Matter of Silver" an international interdisciplinary conference July 2021 

Leverhulme Research Fellowship: 'Silver: Surface & Substance' 2018-19.
Robert Lehman Visiting Professor, Villa I Tatti, The Harvard Center for Italian Renaissance Studies, Florence, Italy, 2017.
Ruth and Clarence Kennedy Professor in Renaissance Studies: Smith College, Mass., US, 2014.
Distinguished Visiting Professor University of Colorado Boulder, US, 2014.
Distinguished Visiting Professor, Department of Art, Emory University, US, 2013.
Millard Meiss Publication Award, 2011 for The Matter of Miracles.
Scouloudi Historical Award publication grant, 2011 from the Scouloudi Foundation in association with the Institute of Historical Research for The Matter of Miracles.
Distinguished Visiting Professor at the University of Stockholm, Sweden: 2008.
Weiss/Brown Publication Subvention Award, 2004 for Invisible City: The Architecture of Devotion in Seventeenth-Century Neapolitan Convents.
Best Book Prize, 2004, the Society for the Study of Early Modern Women (US) awarded to Invisible City: The Architecture of Devotion in Seventeenth-Century Neapolitan Convents.

Publications 
Helen Hills has published numerous books and articles on art and architectural history, including:

The Matter of Miracles: Neapolitan Baroque Architecture and Sanctity (Manchester University Press, 2016) 
New Approaches to Naples (Routledge, 2013) 
Rethinking the Baroque (Ashgate, 2011 and Routledge, 2016) 
Representing Emotions: New Connections in the Histories of Art, Music and Medicine, (Ashgate, 2005) 
Invisible City: The Architecture of Devotion in Seventeenth-Century Neapolitan Convents (Oxford University Press, 2004) 
Architecture and the Politics of Gender (Ashgate, 2003 and Routledge, 2017) 
Fabrications: New Art and Urban Memory in Manchester (Manchester: UMiM, 2002) 
Marmi Mischi Siciliani: Invenzione e Identità (Inlaid polychromatic marble decoration in early modern Sicily: Invention and identity) (Società Messinese di Storia Patria, 1999)

Hills edited Open Arts Journal, Issue 6: Baroque Naples: place and displacement, Winter 2017/8

Other information 
Helen Hills was a guest contributor to the BBC radio programme In Our Time on The Baroque Movement in November 2008. Night Waves Invited discussant on the 'Baroque':  20 March 2013.

Photographs contributed by Helen Hills to the Conway Library are currently being digitised by the Courtauld Institute of Art, as part of the Courtauld Connects project.

References

External links
 Podcast

British art historians
Women art historians
British women historians
1960 births
Living people
Academics of the University of York
Academics of the University of Manchester
20th-century British historians
British expatriate academics in Canada
21st-century British historians
University of North Carolina at Chapel Hill faculty
British expatriate academics in the United States
Academic staff of Queen's University at Kingston
British expatriates in the United States
Alumni of the University of Oxford
Queen's University at Kingston people
Alumni of the Courtauld Institute of Art
20th-century British women writers
21st-century British women writers